The 1949 Liège–Bastogne–Liège was the 35th edition of the Liège–Bastogne–Liège cycle race and was held on 1 May 1949. The race started and finished in Liège. The race was won by Camille Danguillaume.

General classification

References

1949
1949 in Belgian sport